Edgar “Egai” Talusan Fernandez (born 1955) is a Filipino socialist-realist painter. His art style is noted for portraying the Philippines as "a multi-ethnic country that is still embroiled in social issues such as civil conflicts."  Active in the Philippine art scene since the 1970s, he is particularly known for his activist art which criticized the dictatorship of former Philippine President Ferdinand Marcos.

He studied advertising at the Philippine Women's University under the mentorship of renowned Philippine abstractionists Lee Aguinaldo and Justin Nuyda, who helped influenced his early style. His developing affiliation with activist groups eventually led to him becoming one of the founders of the Kaisahan group, which would become one of the bastions for Social Realism in the country.

Fernandez's style as a social realist painter is largely defined by his iconography depicting the many trials plaguing Philippine society.

Solo exhibitions
Modular Paintings, Ateneo Art Gallery, Philippines, 1975
Reflections, National Commission for Culture and the Arts Gallery, Philippines, 2012
Sound of Silence: Remembering Martial Law, National Commission for Culture and the Arts Gallery, Philippines, 2016

References 

1955 births
20th-century Filipino painters
21st-century Filipino painters
Artists featured at the Bantayog ng mga Bayani
Living people